The third series of Line of Duty, consisting of six episodes, premiered on 24 March 2016 on BBC Two. The series follows Superintendent Ted Hastings (Adrian Dunbar), DS Steve Arnott (Martin Compston) and DC Kate Fleming (Vicky McClure) as they lead an investigation into the corrupt actions of Sergeant Danny Waldron (Daniel Mays). Supporting cast includes Craig Parkinson as DI Matthew "Dot" Cottan and Polly Walker as Gill Biggeloe. Keeley Hawes returns as DI Lindsay Denton.

Cast

Main cast
 Daniel Mays as Sergeant Daniel Waldron
 Martin Compston as DS Steve Arnott
 Vicky McClure as DC Kate Fleming
 Adrian Dunbar as Superintendent Ted Hastings
 Craig Parkinson as DI Matthew "Dot" Cottan
 Keeley Hawes as Lindsay Denton

Supporting cast

 Maya Sondhi as PC Maneet Bindra
 Polly Walker as Gill Biggeloe, special counsel to the police and crime commissioner 
 Neil Morrissey as DC Nigel Morton
 Arsher Ali as PC Harinderpal "Hari" Bains 
 Leanne Best as PC Jackie Brickford
 Will Mellor as PC Rod Kennedy 
 Lisa Palfrey as Inspector Tracey McAndrew 
 Aiysha Hart as DS Sam Railston
 Shaun Parkes as Chief Superintendent Terry Reynolds 
 George Costigan as Chief Superintendent Patrick Fairbank
 Mandana Jones as Superintendent Summers
 Jonas Armstrong as Joe Nash
 Adjoa Andoh as prosecutor
 James Edlin as AFO Lambert

Episodes

Reception 
Series 3 saw many positive reviews and continued to achieve higher viewing figures than both previous series. Andrew Billen of The Times praised the series quoting "The characters have been memorable, sometimes indelibly so. The plotting has been meticulous, demanding our more than usual attention. Yet it has remained a work of social realism." James Watson of The Spectator wrote "what makes Line of Duty so good is not just the traditional pleasures of plot, pace and characterisation. It's also Mercurio's entirely justified belief that the more technical aspects of an anti-corruption case can be extremely dramatic too."

Home entertainment releases

Blu-ray
Blu-ray releases for Line of Duty

References

Line of Duty
2016 British television seasons